TPCD may refer to: 

The Pussycat Dolls, an American pop girl group and dance ensemble of the 1990s and 2000s decades
Two-photon circular dichroism